Events in the year 1870 in Belgium.

Incumbents
Monarch: Leopold II
Head of government: Walthère Frère-Orban (to 16 June); Jules d'Anethan (from 2 July)

Events
March
 4 March – Law on Temporalities establishes state oversight of parish finances.

May
 23 May – Provincial elections

June
 3 June – new conscription law, expanding numbers but retaining selection by lottery.
 11 June – Partial legislative elections of 1870 return a hung parliament
 16 June – Walthère Frère-Orban resigns as Prime Minister
 18 June – Affligem Abbey, closed in 1796, refounded.

July
 2 July – Jules d'Anethan replaces Walthère Frère-Orban as Prime Minister
 13 July – Liberal Party conference in Brussels draws up new party programme.
 15 July – General mobilisation in response to the outbreak of the Franco-Prussian War

August
 2 August – General election, to break impasse of hung parliament, returns Catholic Party majority.
 11 August – France and Prussia give assurances to Britain that Belgian neutrality will be respected during the Franco-Prussian War.

September
 2 September – Belgian Red Cross despatches medical units to Lorraine in the wake of the Battle of Sedan.
 23 September – Sumptuous public celebration of the 40th anniversary of Belgian independence.

Publications
Periodicals
 Almanach royal officiel (Brussels, E. Guyot)
 Annuaire statistique de la Belgique begins publication (Brussels, Imprimerie de Delevingne et Callewaert)
 L'Illustration Européenne begins publication (Brussels, Bureaux de l'Administration)

Official studies and reports
 Épidémie typhoïde de 1869 (Brussels), report of the commission of inquiry into the 1869 epidemic of typhoid fever

Books
 Émile de Borchgrave, Histoire des rapports de droit public qui existèrent entre les provinces belges et l'Empire d'Allemagne depuis le démembrement de la monarchie carolingienne jusqu'à l'incorporation de la Belgique à la République française (Brussels, 1870)
 Prosper de Haulleville, De l'enseignement primaire en Belgique
 Prosper de Haulleville, La Nationalité belge; ou Flamands et Wallons
 Émile de Laveleye, La Russie et l'Autriche depuis Sadowa
 Émile de Laveleye, "Land System of Belgium and Holland", in Systems of Land Tenure in Various Countries (London, Macmillan & Co.)
 François Merten, Géographie industrielle et commerciale de la Belgique (Ghent, H. Hoste)
 Adolphe Quetelet, Anthropométrie, ou Mesure des différentes facultés de l'homme (Brussels, Leipzig and Ghent)

Science
 Botanical Garden of Brussels (founded 1826) bought by the Belgian state.

Art and architecture
 Prix de Rome: Xavier Mellery
 22 March – La Monnaie in Brussels stages first performance in French of Richard Wagner's Lohengrin

Births
 4 February – Raoul Warocqué, politician (died 1917)
 28 March – Adolphe De Meulemeester, colonial official (died 1944)
 7 April – Joseph Ryelandt, composer and musicologist (died 1965)
 13 June – Jules Bordet, Nobel prize-winning microbiologist (died 1961)
 28 July – Henri Jaspar, politician (died 1939)
 24 October – Charles Saroléa, philologist (died 1953)
 30 November – Princess Henriette of Belgium (died 1948) and Princess Joséphine Marie of Belgium (died 1871)

Deaths
 30 March – Charles de Groux (born 1825), painter
 8 April – Charles Auguste de Bériot (born 1802), composer
 6 June – Henri Adolphe Schaep (born 1826), painter
 18 July – Jean Théodore Lacordaire (born 1801), entomologist

References

 
Belgium
Years of the 19th century in Belgium
1870s in Belgium
Belgium